Northtown is an unincorporated community in Hart County, Kentucky, United States. It is a populated place at latitude 37.214 and longitude 

-86.001. The elevation of Northtown is 837 feet. It appears on the Mammoth Cave U.S. Geological Survey Map. And is in the Central Time Zone (UTC -6 hours).

References

Unincorporated communities in Hart County, Kentucky
Unincorporated communities in Kentucky
Mammoth Cave National Park